Amanda Lee Wai-man (born 4 October 1970) is a Hong Kong pop singer.

Personal life
Amanda Lee, born in Hong Kong, her ancestral hometown is Sanshui (三水) district, Foshan, China. 
In October 2013, Lee married her British boyfriend of three years, Serge Micallef, a jewellery businessman. Lyricist Wyman Wong stood in place of her father to walk her down the aisle.

Career
Amanda Lee once revealed on a TV show in her ancestral home in Sanshui District. When she was 15 years old, Lee participated in the SING Star Voice Singing Competition on a TVB Jade's program named Enjoy Yourself Tonight. She sang Anita Mui's songs in this competition and was then discovered by a famous singer-songwriter Anthony Lun Wing Leung. Lee started her singing career at the age of 17, which coincided with the Hong Kong music scene in the late 1980s.

Filmography
 An Inspector Calls (2015)
 The Haunted School (2007) - Miss Fong
 House of Mahjong (2007)
 Cocktail (2006)
 Ronin Boys (2005) - Amanda Fong
 Forever Yours (2004)
 Fate Fighter (2003)
 City of SARS (2003)
 My Sassy Boyfriend (2003) - Kuen
 Give Them a Chance (2003)
 Modern Cinderella (2002)
 Women from Mars (2002)
 Happy Family (2002) - Kaka's Mum
 Nine Girls and a Ghost (2002)
 Blue Moon (2001)
 Human Pork Chop (2001)
 Sworn Revenge (2000) - May Chan
 Troublesome Night 7 (2000) - Amanda
 The Untold Story III (1999)
 The Kid (1999)
 Last Ghost Standing (1999) - Snack Bar Vendor
 Troublesome Night 6 (1999) - Cheung Mo
 Troublesome Night 5 (1999)
 9413 (1998) .... Mandy
 Magnificent Team (1998) - Madam Fong
 Ninth Happiness (1998) - Maid
 Troublesome Night 2 (1997) - Anita
 Full Alert (1997) - Chung Lai-Hung
 Love: Amoeba Style (1997) - Ching Ga Mei
 All's Well, Ends Well 1997 (1997) - Monalisa Kam
 The Story of Movie (1996) - Cat
 Best of the Best (1996) - Amanda
 Shanghai Grand (1996) (as Amanda W.M. Lee) - Lai-Man
 Those Were the Days (1996) - Informant
 Banana Club (1996) - Mad
 I'm Your Birthday Cake! (1995) - Sorry
 Hong Kong Graffiti (1995) (uncredited) - Anita Li
 School on Fire (1989)

References

External links
 
 HK cinemagic entry

Hong Kong film actresses
1970 births
Living people
20th-century Hong Kong women singers
21st-century Hong Kong women singers
Hong Kong Mandopop singers